Judson Gilbert Hart (June 13, 1842January 16, 1913) was an American farmer and politician.  He served one term (1879) in the Wisconsin State Assembly, representing northern Milwaukee County, and served as a volunteer in the Union Army during the American Civil War.

Biography

Born in Wauwatosa, Wisconsin Territory, Hart was a farmer. He served in the 1st Wisconsin Volunteer Infantry Regiment (3 Months) and later the 7th Independent Battery Wisconsin Light Artillery during the American Civil War. He served as town treasurer. Hart also served in the Wisconsin State Assembly, in 1879, as a Republican. He died in Milwaukee, Wisconsin.

References

1842 births
1913 deaths
People from Wauwatosa, Wisconsin
People of Wisconsin in the American Civil War
Union Army soldiers
19th-century American politicians
Republican Party members of the Wisconsin State Assembly